Gaby Papenburg (born 27 February 1960 in Walsrode) is a German sport television reporter and television presenter.

Life 
Papenburg studied Comparative literature in Bonn and in Hamburg. In Germany, Papenburg works as a television presenter on broadcaster SAT1. Papenburg is married and has two sons.

External links 
 Gaby Papenburg on sat1.de 
 Management by Gaby Papenburg: H&S Medienservice, Hamburg

German television presenters
German women television presenters
German journalists
German women journalists
German sports journalists
German sports broadcasters
1960 births
Living people
Sat.1 people